"Snow White 2" is a special episode of the British comedy television series The Goodies.

This episode is also known as "Pantomime" and "Snow White and the Seven Dwarfs".

This episode was made by LWT for ITV.

Written by The Goodies, with songs and music by Bill Oddie.

Plot
Just when you thought it was safe to go back to the pantomime ....

The Goodies live next door to Snow White and the Seven Dwarfs.

When Snow White runs away with a handsome prince, she arranges for the dwarfs to be garden gnomes.  When only four of the seven dwarfs are left, they advertise for three other dwarfs to join them.  Tim, Graeme and Bill pretend to be dwarfs and join, but they are unable to go through the front door of the dwarf's home without bumping their heads.  Tim and Graeme then confess to Chief Dwarf that they are not dwarfs — while Bill comments: "I nearly am!"  The Goodies are forced to leave the group because they are too tall.

The Goodies, who are then out of work, leave home.  They get hopelessly lost in a forest and are kidnapped by some ladies.  Taken to a large palace, they have to wait on the princes and princesses (including Snow White, Cinderella and Sleeping Beauty), following which they are thrown on the scrapheap with Buttons, the ugly sisters and other pantomime characters played by men.  The Goodies rebel against their position and are able to win out against the odds.

Cultural references
Pantomimes
Snow White and the Seven Dwarfs
Cinderella
Sleeping Beauty
"Jaws"
"Jaws 2"
"Star Wars"

Guest stars

The Seven Dwarfs
David Rappaport 
Kenny Baker - R2D2 in Star Wars 
 Peter Burroughs
 George Claydon
 Mike Cottrel
 Malcolm Dixon
 Mike Edmonds
 Tony Friel
 John Ghavan
 Rusty Goffe
 Gerald Stadden

Princesses / Princes
 Jacki Barron
 Caroline Dillon
 Jane Faith
 Carol Forbes
 Jackie Hall
 Nola Haynes
 Chrissie Kendall
 Chrissie Monk
 Wanda Rokicki
 Jane Winchester

DVD and VHS releases

This episode has been released on DVD.

References

 "The Goodies Rule OK" — Robert Ross, Carlton Books Ltd, Sydney, 2006
 "From Fringe to Flying Circus — 'Celebrating a Unique Generation of Comedy 1960-1980'" — Roger Wilmut, Eyre Methuen Ltd, 1980
 "The Goodies Episode Summaries" — Brett Allender
 "The Goodies — Fact File" — Matthew K. Sharp

External links
 

The Goodies (series 9) episodes
1981 British television episodes